Year's Best Fantasy and Horror was a reprint anthology published annually by St. Martin's Press from 1987 to 2008. In addition to the short stories, supplemented by a list of honorable mentions, each edition included a number of retrospective essays by the editors and others. The first two anthologies were originally published under the name The Year's Best Fantasy before the title was changed beginning with the third book.

For most of its run, the series was edited by Terri Windling and Ellen Datlow, with Windling primarily responsible for the "fantasy" portion of the content and Datlow for the "horror" portion. From the 16th edition (covering works first published in 2003), Windling's role was taken by the team of Kelly Link and Gavin Grant.  The cover art for every edition was done by Thomas Canty. In 2009, it was announced that there would be no 2009 edition. Ellen Datlow is now editing The Best Horror of the Year published by Night Shade Books.

Volumes

 The Year's Best Fantasy and Horror: First Annual Collection 1987
 The Year's Best Fantasy and Horror: Second Annual Collection 1988
 The Year's Best Fantasy and Horror: Third Annual Collection 1989
 The Year's Best Fantasy and Horror: Fourth Annual Collection 1990
 The Year's Best Fantasy and Horror: Fifth Annual Collection 1991
 The Year's Best Fantasy and Horror: Sixth Annual Collection 1992
 The Year's Best Fantasy and Horror: Seventh Annual Collection 1993
 The Year's Best Fantasy and Horror: Eighth Annual Collection 1994
 The Year's Best Fantasy and Horror: Ninth Annual Collection 1995
 The Year's Best Fantasy and Horror: Tenth Annual Collection 1996
 The Year's Best Fantasy and Horror: Eleventh Annual Collection 1997
 The Year's Best Fantasy and Horror: Twelfth Annual Collection 1998
 The Year's Best Fantasy and Horror: Thirteenth Annual Collection 1999
 The Year's Best Fantasy and Horror: Fourteenth Annual Collection 2000
 The Year's Best Fantasy and Horror: Fifteenth Annual Collection 2001
 The Year's Best Fantasy and Horror: Sixteenth Annual Collection 2002
 The Year's Best Fantasy and Horror: Seventeenth Annual Collection 2003
 The Year's Best Fantasy and Horror: Eighteenth Annual Collection 2004
 The Year's Best Fantasy and Horror: Nineteenth Annual Collection 2005
 The Year's Best Fantasy and Horror: Twentieth Annual Collection 2006
 The Year's Best Fantasy and Horror: Twenty-First Annual Collection 2007
 The Year's Best Fantasy and Horror: Twenty-Second Annual Collection 2008

The Year's Best Fantasy and Horror: First Annual Collection

 "Buffalo Gals, Won't You Come Out Tonight" - Ursula K. Le Guin
 A World Without Toys - T. M. Wright
 DX - Joe Haldeman (poem)
 Friend's Best Man - Jonathan Carroll
 The Snow Apples - Gwyneth Jones
 Ever After - Susan Palwick
 My Name Is Dolly - William F. Nolan
 The Moon's Revenge - Joan Aiken
 Author's Notes - Edward Bryant
 Lake George in High August - John Robert Bensink
 Csucskári - Steven Brust
 The Other Side - Ramsey Campbell
 Pamela's Get - David J. Schow
 Voices in the Wind - Elizabeth S. Helfman
 Once Upon a Time, She Said - Jane Yolen (poem)
 The Circular Library of Stones - Carol Emshwiller
 Soft Monkey - Harlan Ellison
 Fat Face [Cthulhu Mythos] - Michael Shea
 Uncle Dobbin's Parrot Fair [Newford] - Charles de Lint
 The Pear-Shaped Man - George R. R. Martin
 Delta Sly Honey - Lucius Shepard
 Small Heirlooms -  M. John Harrison
 The Improper Princess [Enchanted Forest] - Patricia C. Wrede
 The Fable of the Farmer and Fox - John Brunner
 Haunted - Joyce Carol Oates
 Dead Possums - Kathryn Ptacek
 Pictures Made of Stones - Lucius Shepard (poem)
 Splatter: A Cautionary Tale - Douglas E. Winter
 Gentlemen - John Skipp, Craig Spector
 Demon Luck [Ithkar] - Craig Shaw Gardner
 Words of Power - Jane Yolen
 Jamie's Grave - Lisa Tuttle
 The Maid on the Shore - Delia Sherman
 Halley's Passing - Michael McDowell
 White Trains - Lucius Shepard (poem)
 Simple Sentences - Natalie Babbitt
 A Hypothetical Lizard [Liavek] - Alan Moore

References

External links 
Contents by Volume

Fantasy anthology series
Fantasy books by series
Horror anthologies
1987 anthologies
1988 anthologies
1989 anthologies
1990 anthologies
1991 anthologies
1992 anthologies
1993 anthologies
1994 anthologies
1995 anthologies
1996 anthologies
1997 anthologies
1998 anthologies
1999 anthologies
2000 anthologies
2001 anthologies
2002 anthologies
2003 anthologies
2004 anthologies
2005 anthologies
2006 anthologies
St. Martin's Press books